Police Lieutenant colonel Wijan Ponlid (born April 26, 1976) is a Thai boxer who competed in the Men's Flyweight (– 51 kg) division at the 2000 Summer Olympics and won the gold medal. He returned to Thailand to a hero's welcome: honored with a new house, over 20 million baht, a job promotion (as a police officer in Sukhothai), and paraded at the front of a procession of 49 elephants through the city of Bangkok.

Ponlid defeated Vardan Zakaryan of Germany in round 1, Andrew Kooner of Canada in round 2, upset Cuban Manuel Mantilla in the quarterfinal, beat Vladimir Sidorenko of Ukraine in the semifinal and finally met Atlanta silver medalist Bulat Jumadilov of Kazakhstan in the final. The Thai led after every round of the bout, despite Jumadilov taking the second 6-5 to pull back to 9-7 behind, and caused endless problems for the Kazakh with his probing right lead and quick left.

In a messy fight, both men fell to the canvas twice in the third round as they pushed and clinched, but Ponlid led 15-11 at the bell and then made sure of gold by dominating the fourth.

It was Thailand’s second gold medal in Olympic boxing following featherweight Somluck Kamsing’s euphoric victory at Atlanta in 1996.

And just as Thai supporters feted Somluck in Atlanta for winning Thailand’s first Olympic gold in 44 years, they were just as ecstatic, waving their national flags and chanting his name, as Wijan was acclaimed the champion.

In victory Wijan held aloft a framed photo of King Bhumibol in the ring with the red, white and blue Flag of Thai flag draped around his shoulders.

In Muay thai he fought under the names Sisatchanalai Taxi Meter and Sisatchanalai Sasiprapagym.

Olympic results
Defeated Vardan Zakaryan (Germany) RSC 4
Defeated Andrew Kooner (Canada) 11-7
Defeated Manuel Mantilla (Cuba) 19-8
Defeated Wladimir Sidorenko (Ukraine) 14-11
Defeated Bulat Jumadilov (Kazakhstan) 19-12

Has been called the "Thai Pea" in reference to another great southpaw defensive boxing master, Pernell "Sweet Pea" Whitaker.

Muay Thai record

|- style="background:#cfc;"
| 1999-03- || Win ||align=left| Sansananchai Kiatprasarnchai ||Rangsit Stadium || Pathum Thani, Thailand || Decision || 5 || 3:00
|-
! style=background:white colspan=9 |

|- style="background:#c5d2ea;"
| 1999-01-21 || Draw ||align=left| Sansananchai Kiatprasarnchai ||Rangsit Stadium || Pathum Thani, Thailand || Decision || 5 || 3:00

|- style="background:#fbb;"
| 1998-12- || Loss ||align=left| Kasemlek Kiatsiri ||Rangsit Stadium || Pathum Thani, Thailand || Decision || 5 || 3:00

|- style="background:#fbb;"
| 1998-11-18 || Loss||align=left| Yodthanu Daopaetriew || Rangsit Stadium || Pathum Thani, Thailand || Decision || 5 || 3:00
|-
! style=background:white colspan=9 |

|- style="background:#cfc;"
| 1998-10-15 || Win ||align=left| Sornram Sitsiayam || Rangsit Stadium || Pathum Thani, Thailand || Decision || 5 || 3:00

|- style="background:#fbb;"
| 1998-07-13 || Loss||align=left| Saenchai Sor.Kingstar || Lumpinee Stadium || Bangkok, Thailand || Decision || 5 || 3:00

|- style="background:#cfc;"
| 1997-12-08 || Win||align=left| Yodthanu Daopaetriew || Rajadamnern Stadium || Bangkok, Thailand || Decision || 5 || 3:00
|-
! style=background:white colspan=9 |

|- style="background:#fbb;"
| 1997-10-09 || Loss||align=left| Palangphet Por.Srithong || Lumpinee Stadium || Bangkok, Thailand || Decision || 5 || 3:00

|- style="background:#fbb;"
| 1997-03-12 || Loss||align=left| Sansananchai Kiatprasarnchai || Rajadamnern Stadium || Bangkok, Thailand || Decision || 5 || 3:00

|- style="background:#fbb;"
| 1996-10-21 || Loss||align=left| Palangphet Por.Srithong || Rajadamnern Stadium || Bangkok, Thailand || Decision || 5 || 3:00

|- style="background:#cfc;"
| 1996-04-04 || Win||align=left| Chatchainoi Chawraiaoy || Rajadamnern Stadium || Bangkok, Thailand || Decision || 5 || 3:00

|- style="background:#fbb;"
| 1995-09-13 || Loss||align=left| Jaipetch Chor.Chutirat || Rajadamnern Stadium || Bangkok, Thailand || Decision || 5 || 3:00

|- style="background:#cfc;"
| 1995-08-17 || Win||align=left| Saenthanong Lukbanyai || Rajadamnern Stadium || Bangkok, Thailand || Decision || 5 || 3:00

|- style="background:#cfc;"
| 1995-03-09 || Win||align=left| Khaopong Pinsinchai || Rajadamnern Stadium || Bangkok, Thailand || Decision || 5 || 3:00

|- style="background:#cfc;"
| 1994-10-13 || Win||align=left| Petchwangchan Lukchaophophrakan || Rajadamnern Stadium || Bangkok, Thailand || Decision || 5 || 3:00

|- style="background:#cfc;"
| 1994-02-16 || Win||align=left| Inseenoi Sereefarm || Rajadamnern Stadium || Bangkok, Thailand || Decision || 5 || 3:00

|- style="background:#cfc;"
| 1993-04-22 || Win||align=left| Surat Kiatkamthorn || Rajadamnern Stadium || Bangkok, Thailand || Decision || 5 || 3:00
|-
| colspan=9 | Legend:

External links

1976 births
Boxers at the 2000 Summer Olympics
Living people
Wijan Ponlid
Wijan Ponlid
Wijan Ponlid
Olympic medalists in boxing
Wijan Ponlid
Wijan Ponlid
Medalists at the 2000 Summer Olympics
Competitors at the 1999 Southeast Asian Games
Southeast Asian Games medalists in boxing
Wijan Ponlid
Flyweight boxers